Élan Luz Rivera (born June 1982) is an American Latin hip hop singer and actress. She is one-third of Latin hip-hop trio The D.E.Y.

Voices
 Sunny Day - Rox
 Grand Theft Auto IV: The Ballad of Gay Tony - The People of Liberty City
 Grand Theft Auto IV - Carmen Ortiz

Life and career
Rivera was born and raised in New York City. As a child she worked as an actress, appearing in the movie, Life with Mikey, and also made a guest appearance on the television series, Ghostwriter. Elan attended LaGuardia High School for Music and Art and Performing Arts (The "Fame" School).
She made her first appearance on Broadway as Cookie in the musical play The Capeman from 29 January to 28 March 1998 at the Marquis Theatre in  New York, From 26 April to 13 May 2001 she played Susie Rogers in musical comedy The Adventures of Tom Sawyer at the Minskoff Theatre in New York. In 2005, Divine introduced her to rapper Yeyo. During the making of their album, she worked with the American pop singer Ashley Tisdale in the background vocals for her 2007 hit song "He Said She Said" and wrote "Fuego" for The Cheetah Girls' first Bi-lingual single with producer J.R. Rotem and songwriter Evan Bogart.

Rivera was featured and wrote on The 2008 LL Cool J album Exit 13 under the name Elan of The Dey.

Artistry
Rivera has formal training in singing in Hindi, German, Italian, Spanish and Sanskrit.

References

External links
Sony Japan The DEY Official Website

1982 births
Living people
21st-century American singers
21st-century American women singers
Actresses from New York City
American women pop singers
American film actresses
American Latin pop singers
American television actresses
American video game actresses
Singers from New York City
Fiorello H. LaGuardia High School alumni
Entertainers from the Bronx